Norman B. Purucker (June 24, 1917 – November 12, 2014) was an American football player.

Early years
A native of Youngstown, Ohio, Purucker was the son of Frederick Purucker, a pipe fitter at a steel mill, who later worked as a meat cutter at a market. The family moved to Boardman, Ohio, while Purucker was a child.  He attended Boardman High School where he was a star in football, basketball and track and field.  The Vindicator called him "the greatest all-around athlete in Boardman history." In 1980, he became the first person inducted into the Boardman High School Hall of Fame.

University of Michigan
Purucker enrolled at the University of Michigan and played at the halfback and punter positions for the Michigan Wolverines football team from 1936 to 1938.  He was also a sprinter on the Michigan track team in 1938 and 1939.

Professional football
Purucker signed with the Green Bay Packers in 1939, but was released in September 1939 after reporting late due to his attendance at summer classes at Michigan. He filed a $2,000 lawsuit against the Packers that he had been promised $175 per game, regardless of whether he played. Purucker further alleged that he was released after sustaining an injury in a game against the Texas All-Stars.

Later years
In January 1942, Purucker was accepted as a physical instructor with the United States Navy. He later worked as a real estate broker and income tax consultant.  He died in Boardman, Ohio, in 2014 at age 97.

References

1917 births
2014 deaths
American football halfbacks
Michigan Wolverines football players
Players of American football from Youngstown, Ohio
People from Boardman, Ohio
United States Navy personnel of World War II